Mutation Research is a peer-reviewed scientific journal that publishes research papers in the area of mutation research which focus on fundamental mechanisms underlying the phenotypic and genotypic expression of genetic damage. There are currently three sections:

 Mutation Research/Fundamental and Molecular Mechanisms of Mutagenesis (impact factor 2020: 2.433)
 Mutation Research/Genetic Toxicology and Environmental Mutagenesis (impact factor 2020: 2.873)
 Mutation Research/Reviews in Mutation Research (impact factor 2020: 5.657)

Two previous sections
 Mutation Research/DNA Repair Reports
 Mutation Research/DNA Repair
are now continued as DNA Repair.

References

Genetics journals
Publications established in 1964
Elsevier academic journals
Journals more frequent than weekly